Zinc finger protein 222 is a protein that in humans is encoded by the ZNF222 gene.

References

Further reading